KHCB (1400 kHz) is a commercial AM radio station owned by Houston Christian Broadcasters, Inc.  It is licensed to League City, Texas, and serves Greater Houston.  KHCB airs a Spanish-language Christian radio format.  The studios and offices are on South Boulevard in Houston.

KHCB is powered at 1,000 watts, using a directional antenna.  The transmitter is off Crews Road in League City.  Its programming is also carried by an FM translator station, K268CW at 101.5 MHz.

History
KHCB is believed to be the oldest continuously licensed radio facility in the Houston-Galveston area, as well as the oldest Texas Gulf Coast station.

The station's first license, with its sequentially assigned call sign KFLX, was granted on November 28, 1923, to George R. Clough.  The original studios were at 1214 40th Street in Galveston. (Some accounts trace its history to an earlier station, WHAB, which was licensed to Fellman's Department Store on June 29, 1922, and deleted in June 1924.)

On November 11, 1928, as part of a major reallocation enacted by implementation of the Federal Radio Commission's General Order 40, KFLX was assigned to 1370 kHz. In 1933 the call letters were changed to KLUF, after another Galveston station using a similar call sign, KFUL, signed off the air. As a result of the North American Regional Broadcasting Agreement (NARBA) of 1941, KLUF moved to 1400 kHz.

In 1957, after George Roy Clough sold the station, the call letters were changed to KILE,  and the station became Galveston Island's legendary "Big 14 KILE" with the adoption of a Top 40 format on September 2, 1957.

In 1991, the station was sold to Houston Christian Broadcasters, which changed the call sign to KHCB and adopted a Spanish Christian format. After nearly 80 years of broadcasting from Galveston Island, the facility was relocated to the mainland, near Texas City, Texas in 2009.

FM Translator
In addition to the main station on AM 1400, beginning on August 15, 2016, KHCB is heard on an FM translator on 101.5 MHz.

References

External links

KHCB Radio Network

FCC History Cards for KHCB (covering KFLX / KLUF / KILE from 1927-1980)

HCB (AM)
Mass media in Galveston, Texas
Radio stations established in 1923
HCB (AM)
1923 establishments in Texas